Antoine Lake is a lake in Alberta, Canada.

Antoine Lake has the name of Antoine Desjarlais, a Metis, pioneer fur trader.

References

Lakes of Alberta